The S&C Subdivision is a railroad line owned and operated by CSX Transportation in the U.S. state of Pennsylvania. The line runs from the Keystone Subdivision at Rockwood north to Johnstown along a former Baltimore and Ohio Railroad line, once the Somerset and Cambria Railroad.

History
The Somerset & Mineral Point Railroad connected Somerset to what was then the Pittsburgh & Connellsville Railroad as it passed through Rockwood (then called Mineral Point) in the early 1870s. 

The Johnstown & Somerset Railroad followed the Stonycreek valley north-by-northeast from Somerset through Stoystown to Johnstown around 1880.  The Somerset & Mineral Point Railroad and the Johnstown & Somerset Railroad were combined and reorganized as the Somerset and Cambria Branch Railroad.

Through leases and mergers, the line became part of the B&O and then CSX.

References

CSX Transportation lines
Rail infrastructure in Pennsylvania
Baltimore and Ohio Railroad lines